Registered on October 26 1984, the Deadly Serious Party was a political party that stood candidates in  Australian elections in the 1980s. The party was created by Australian candidates with the goal of mocking other candidates. Its platform included dispatching a flock of killer penguins to protect Australia's coastline from Argentine invasion, an age freeze, and the appointment of silly people to all the portfolios that matter. It was deregistered effective 2 November 1988 for not having the required 500 members.

References

1980s establishments in Australia
1988 disestablishments in Australia
Defunct political parties in the Australian Capital Territory
Joke political parties in Australia
Political parties established in the 1980s
Political parties disestablished in 1988